William David "Dee" Hardison (May 2, 1956 – April 21, 2018) was a National Football League defensive end and defensive tackle who played for the Buffalo Bills (1978–1980), the New York Giants (1982–1985), the San Diego Chargers (1986–1987) and the Kansas City Chiefs (1988).  He played college football at the University of North Carolina.

Hardison helped the Bills win the 1980 AFC East Division and helped the Bills defense lead the NFL in fewest passing yards allowed in 1978 and the AFC in 1979 and 1980 and NFL in fewest total yards allowed in 1980 and the Chiefs lead the NFL in fewest passing yards allowed in 1988.

In ten seasons, Hardison had nine sacks.

Hardison died on April 21, 2018 at the age of 61.

References

1956 births
2018 deaths
All-American college football players
People from Jacksonville, North Carolina
American football defensive linemen
North Carolina Tar Heels football players
Buffalo Bills players
New York Giants players
San Diego Chargers players
Kansas City Chiefs players